Calliotropis concavospira is a species of sea snail, a marine gastropod mollusk in the family Eucyclidae.

Description
The shell can grow to be 9 mm.

Distribution
This marine species occurs off Papua New Guinea, Timor, and Indonesia.

References

 Vilvens C. (2007) New records and new species of Calliotropis from Indo-Pacific. Novapex 8 (Hors Série 5): 1–72.

External links

concavospira
Gastropods described in 1908